The Insolvency Act 1986 (c 45) is an Act of the Parliament of the United Kingdom that provides the  legal platform for all matters relating to personal and corporate insolvency in the UK.

History
The Insolvency Act 1986 followed the publication and most of the findings in the Cork Report, including the introduction of the Individual Voluntary Arrangement (IVA) and Company Voluntary Arrangement (CVA) procedures.

Elements of the Act have been updated by the Enterprise Act 2002 which came into enforcement on 1 April 2004 and introduced amongst other things the popular "out-of-court" administration route.

Those considering the main Act should also refer to the Insolvency Rules 1986 and numerous Regulations and other amending legislation since 1986, and also to the best practice which applies to the administration of formal insolvency matters set out in the Statements of Insolvency Practice (SIPs) approved by the insolvency practitioner authorising bodies.

Further updates to the Act were made by the Corporate Insolvency and Governance Act 2020, which provided a moratorium for companies that were likely to become insolvent and gave additional reliefs for businesses that were adversely impacted by the COVID-19 pandemic.

Contents
The Insolvency Act 1986 essentially governs issues relating to personal bankruptcy and Individual Voluntary Arrangements and all administrative orders relating to company insolvency.

Companies winding up

Part I - Company Voluntary Arrangements
Part II - Administration Orders
Part III - Receivership (ss 22-72H)
 Chapter I - Receivers and Managers (England and Wales)
 Chapter II - Receivers (Scotland)
 Chapter III - Receivers Powers in Great Britain as a whole
Part IV - Winding Up of Companies Registered Under the Companies Acts (ss 73-219)
 Chapter I - Preliminary
 Chapter II - Voluntary Winding Up (Introductory and General)
 Chapter III - Members' Voluntary Winding Up (ss 91-96)
 Chapter IV - Creditors' Voluntary Winding Up (ss 97-106)
 Chapter V - Provisions Applying to both kinds of Winding up
 Chapter VI - Winding Up by the Court (ss 117-162)
 Chapter VII - Liquidators
 Chapter VIII - Provisions of general application in winding up
 Chapter IX - Dissolution of companies after winding up
 Chapter X - Malpractice before and during Liquidation; Penalisation of companies and company officers; Investigations and prosecutions (ss 206-219). Section 213 lies within this part, and provides for individuals who are aware that business has been carried on with the intent to defraud the company's creditors to be called upon to contribute to the company’s assets.
Part V - Winding Up Unregistered Companies (ss 220-229)
Part VI - Miscellaneous Provisions applying to Companies which are Insolvent or in Liquidation
Part VII - Interpretation for first group of parts

Insolvency of individuals – bankruptcy

Part VIII - Individual Voluntary Arrangements
Part IX - Bankruptcy (ss 264-371)
 Chapter I - Bankruptcy Petitions - Bankruptcy Orders
 Chapter II - Protection of Bankrupt's Estate and Investigation of his Affairs
 Chapter III - Trustees in Bankruptcy
 Chapter IV - Administration by Trustee
 Chapter V - Effect of Bankruptcy on certain rights, transactions etc.
 Chapter VI - Bankruptcy Offences
 Chapter VII - Powers of Court in Bankruptcy
Part X - Individual Insolvency: General Provisions
Part XI - Interpretation for second group of parts

Miscellaneous matters
Part XII - Preferential debts in company and individual insolvency
Part XIII - Insolvency Practitioners and their qualifications (ss 338-398)
Part XIV - Public Administration (ss 399-410)
Part XV - Subordinate Legislation
Part XVI - Provisions against debt avoidance (England and Wales Only)
Part XVII - Miscellaneous and General
Part XVIII - Interpretation
Part XIX - Final Provisions

Schedules

Schedule B1, on the new administration procedure after the Enterprise Act 2002.

Notes

External links
Original text of the statute as published by the Office of Public Sector Information
Text of Act from insolvencyhelpline.co.uk

Insolvency Service website
Insolvency Practitioners Association website

United Kingdom Acts of Parliament 1986
Insolvency law of the United Kingdom
United Kingdom company law
Bankruptcy in the United Kingdom